The canton of Pont-l'Abbé is an administrative division of the Finistère department, northwestern France. Its borders were modified at the French canton reorganisation which came into effect in March 2015. Its seat is in Pont-l'Abbé.

It consists of the following communes:
Guilvinec
Loctudy
Penmarch
Plobannalec-Lesconil
Pont-l'Abbé
Treffiagat

References

Cantons of Finistère